The Ariake Gymnastics Centre is a temporary sports arena located in the Ariake district of Tokyo, Japan. Opened in October 2019, the venue was constructed to host the gymnastics events at the 2020 Summer Olympics and the boccia events at the 2020 Summer Paralympics.

References 

Venues of the 2020 Summer Olympics